Events in the year 1860 in Iceland.

Incumbents 

 Monarch: Frederick VII of Denmark
 Council President of Denmark: Carl Edvard Rotwitt (until 8 February) Carl Frederik Blixen-Finecke (until 24 February) Carl Christian Hall onwards

Births 

 4 April − Kristjan Niels Julius, poet.
 4 May − Bogi Thorarensen Melsteð, historian.

References 

 
1860s in Iceland
Years of the 19th century in Iceland
Iceland
Iceland